{{Automatic taxobox
| image = Microhierax erythrogenys.jpg
| image_caption = Philippine falconet (Microhierax erythrogenys)
| taxon = Microhierax
| authority = Sharpe, 1874
| subdivision_ranks = Species
| subdivision = 
 M. caerulescens M. fringillarius M. latifrons M. erythrogenys M. melanoleucus}}

The typical falconets, Microhierax, are a bird of prey genus in the family Falconidae. The smallest members of the genus are the relatively widespread black-thighed falconet, and the white-fronted falconet on the island of Borneo.

Taxonomy and systematics
The first description by a European ornithologist of a falconet from this group was published by George Edwards in 1750, as "the little black and orange colour'd Indian hawk". It was from a specimen that had been collected in Bengal and sent to the King's physician, Dr Mead. In 1758 Carl Linnaeus used the illustration and description by Edwards to formally describe the species under the binomial name Falco cærulescens In 1760 the French naturalist Mathurin Jacques Brisson also used Edwards' publication to describe . Although the white collar was not mentioned, the English ornithologist Richard Bowdler Sharpe believed that this was the same species that we now call the collared falconet.

In 1824, Vigors proposed a new genus Ierax, writing "whoever has seen that beautiful species, the smallest of its race, F. cærulescens, Linn., now rendered familiar to us by the accurate and splendid illustrations of Dr. Horsfield, will at once acknowledge its separation from every other established genus of its family." Later authors rendered the name Hierax.

Sharpe coined the name Microhierax in 1874, from the Greek  meaning "tiny hawk". By this time, four species were known: M. cærulescens, M. fringillarius, M. melanoleucus, and M. erythrogenys. He lists Horsfield's specimen "Falco cærulescens" as being actually M. fringillarius, making the latter the type of the genus.

A fifth species, the white-fronted falconet M. latifrons, was described by Sharpe in 1879.Page 237 and plate 7 in 

Extant Species

References

External links
 A. Pelletier (illustrator), C. [Charles Joseph] Hullmandel (lithographer) 1822. Illustration of Falco cærulescens from Java [later Microhierax fringillarius] BHL (Smithsonian) BHL(Singapore). Plate 35 in 
 Section Falco cærulescens'', page 135 IA BHL in  "The drawing of Edwards was made from a bird sent from Bengal. The Javan specimens are somewhat smaller, and differently marked. They appear to form a distinct variety..."

 
Bird genera

Taxonomy articles created by Polbot
Taxa named by Richard Bowdler Sharpe